Dirk Becker (born 4 May 1966 in Bielefeld, North Rhine-Westphalia) is a German politician and member of the SPD.

From 2005 to 2015 he was a member of the Bundestag. Since 2015 he has been the mayor of Oerlinghausen.

External links 
 Official website

1966 births
Living people
Politicians from Bielefeld
Members of the Bundestag for North Rhine-Westphalia
Mayors of places in Germany
Members of the Bundestag 2013–2017
Members of the Bundestag 2005–2009
Members of the Bundestag 2009–2013
Members of the Bundestag for the Social Democratic Party of Germany